Marc Forster (born 30 November 1969) is a Swiss filmmaker. He is best known for directing the feature films Monster's Ball, Finding Neverland, Stranger than Fiction, Quantum of Solace, World War Z, and Christopher Robin, and has directed numerous television commercials as well. He is a BAFTA, Golden Globe, and Independent Spirit Award nominee.

Life and career 
Forster was born on 30 November 1969 in Au (today Illertissen), in the Neu-Ulm district of Bavaria, Germany. His parents, a German doctor and a Swiss architect moved to Switzerland when Forster was 9 years old. He spent his adolescence in Davos, a winter resort in eastern Switzerland, and as well as at the international boarding school Institut Montana Zugerberg in central Switzerland.

In 1990, when he was 20 years old, Forster moved to New York, in the United States. For the next three years, he attended New York University's film school, making several documentary films. In 1995, he moved to Hollywood and shot an experimental low-budget film for $10,000 called Loungers, which won the Audience Award at the Slamdance Film Festival. Forster's first feature-length motion picture was the psychological drama Everything Put Together (2000), which was nominated for the Grand Jury Prize at the Sundance Film Festival.

His breakthrough film was Monster's Ball (2001), in which he directed Halle Berry in her Academy Award-winning performance as the wife of a man on death row. The film also starred Billy Bob Thornton, Heath Ledger, Peter Boyle, and Sean Combs. His next film, Finding Neverland (2004), was based on the life of author J.M. Barrie. The film was nominated for five Golden Globe Awards and seven Academy Awards, including the Best Picture. Forster received BAFTA, Directors Guild of America, and Golden Globe nominations for his direction.

Forster's next film, the thriller Stay (2005) starred Ewan McGregor and Naomi Watts and grossed $8 million (USD) in the United States on an estimated budget of $50 million. Stranger than Fiction (2006), a surreal romantic comedy starring Will Ferrell, was a critical success. The film grossed $54 million worldwide  and earned Will Ferrell a nomination for a Golden Globe Award for Best Actor – Motion Picture Musical or Comedy.

Forster then directed an adaptation of best-seller Khaled Hosseini's The Kite Runner, scripted by repeat collaborator David Benioff and starring British newcomer Khalid Abdalla. The film follows an Afghani-American man who returns to his war-ravaged country to save the son of his former best friend. The Kite Runner was released on December 14, 2007, and grossed $73 million worldwide. It also earned a nomination for a Golden Globe Award for Best Foreign Language Film and a BAFTA bid for Film Not In the English Language.

Additionally, Forster directed the 22nd James Bond film, Quantum of Solace, which began shooting on January 2, 2008, shortly after his 38th birthday, making him the youngest director in the series' history (beating the previous record set by Guy Hamilton, who was 41 when he directed Goldfinger five years before Forster's birth). Quantum of Solace was released in the United Kingdom on October 31, 2008.  It became one of the highest grossing Bond films in the franchise's history, with a worldwide box office of more than $586 million.

Forster directed the film adaptation of the novel World War Z, starring Brad Pitt, which Paramount announced at the July 2010 San Diego Comic-Con. The film opened June 21, 2013 to more than $66 million and has grossed more than $540 million worldwide. To date, it is the highest-grossing film of Brad Pitt's career and is the most successful Zombie movie of all time.

Forster directed his screenplay of All I See Is You, a visually driven drama following a blind woman (Blake Lively) and her husband (Jason Clarke) who, upon the restoration of her sight, begin to discover previously unseen and disturbing details about themselves and their marriage, released in 2016.

In November 2016, Walt Disney Pictures announced that Forster would direct the live-action film adaptation of Winnie the Pooh, which was titled Christopher Robin. The film had its world premiere on July 30, 2018, and was theatrically released on August 3, 2018. Forster along with Will Smith bought German rights group Telepool in June 2018.

In October 2020, Mattel announced that Forster will be directing and producing an animated/live-action Thomas & Friends film based on the franchise of the same name.

In January 2022, it was announced that Forster would reunite with Finding Neverland screenwriter David Magee and direct A Man Called Otto, an English-language remake of the Swedish film A Man Called Ove starring Tom Hanks. Filming began in February 2022 in Pittsburgh, while Sony Pictures acquired the worldwide distribution rights for $60 million at the European Film Market, the highest-ever figure paid at the market for a film, for theatrical release in December 2022. In July, Forster was announced as directing an adaptation of the Neil Gaiman fantasy novel The Graveyard Book for Walt Disney Pictures.

Filmography

Films

Producer
 Sueño (2005)

Executive producer
 Disconnect (2012)
 Come Sunday (2018)
 My Dog Stupid (2019)

Short films

Television

Awards

References

External links

 
"Straight on Till Morning" Marc Forster interviewed at AlterNet.

1969 births
Living people
Skydance Media people
German expatriates in the United States
German film directors
German film producers
German male writers
German screenwriters
German male screenwriters
People from Illertissen
Swiss expatriates in the United States
Swiss-German people
German people of Swiss descent
Swiss film directors
Swiss film producers
Swiss male writers
Swiss screenwriters
Tisch School of the Arts alumni
Writers from New York City